The Hanke–Henry Permanent Calendar (HHPC) is a proposal for calendar reform. It is one of many examples of leap week calendars, calendars that maintain synchronization with the solar year by intercalating entire weeks rather than single days. It is a modification of a previous proposal, Common-Civil-Calendar-and-Time (CCC&T). With the Hanke–Henry Permanent Calendar, every calendar date always falls on the same day of the week. A major feature of the calendar system is the abolition of time zones.

Features 

While many calendar reforms aim to make the calendar more accurate, the Hanke–Henry Permanent Calendar focuses on making the calendar perennial, so that every date falls on the same day of the week, year after year. The familiar drift of weekdays concerning dates results from the fact that the number of days in a physical year (one full orbit of Earth around the Sun, approximately 365.24 days) is not a multiple of seven. By reducing common years to 364 days (52 weeks), and adding an extra week every five or six years, the Hanke–Henry Permanent Calendar eliminates weekday drift and synchronizes the calendar year with the seasonal change as the Earth circles the Sun. The leap week known as "Xtra", occurs every year that either begins (dominical letters D, DC) or ends (D, ED) in a Thursday on the corresponding Gregorian calendar, and falls between the end of December and the beginning of January. Thus, each year always begins between December 29 and January 4 in the Gregorian calendar. This is effectively the same rule as in ISO week dates.

Under the Hanke–Henry Permanent Calendar January, February, April, May, July, August, October, and November have thirty days, while March, June, September, and December have thirty-one so that each quarter contains two 30-day months followed by one month of 31 days (30:30:31). While the Hanke–Henry Permanent Calendar changes the length of the months, the week and days remain the same. 

Hanke and Henry do not offer a serious discussion of anniversaries, especially the ones commemorated on 31 January, 31 May, 31 July, 31 August, and 31 October (as these days are eliminated). Their website FAQ simply recommends to either celebrate one's birthday on a random day of one's choosing, or more systematically use the 30th and last day of that month, which makes sense for some feasts like Halloween at least. A third solution, which has been adopted with calendar reforms elsewhere, would be to apply the calendar proleptically and find the corresponding date in the original year, though this would probably have to be done for all dates: e.g. the 4th of July in 1776 (Independence Day) was a Thursday as it is in HHPC, but the 14th of July in 1789 (Bastille Day) was on a Tuesday, not a Sunday, and would hence need to be moved to the 16th of July.

As part of the calendar proposal, time zones would be eliminated and replaced with Coordinated Universal Time (UTC).

Henry argues that his proposal will succeed where some others have failed because it keeps the weekly cycle intact, and therefore respects the Fourth Commandment (Remember the sabbath day, to keep it holy) of Judaism and Christianity.

History 

In 2004, Richard Conn Henry, a professor of astronomy at Johns Hopkins University, proposed the adoption of a calendar known as Common-Civil-Calendar-and-Time (CCC&T), which he described as a modification to a proposal by Robert McClenon. Henry's original version had essentially the same structure given above, but inserted its leap week named "Newton" between June and July in the middle of the year. 

The leap rule was chosen to match the ISO week leap rule, to minimise the variation in the start of the year relative to the Gregorian calendar, whereas Robert McClenon originally proposed a simple leap rule which would result in larger astronomic variance: Years whose numbers are divisible by 5 had a leap week, but years whose numbers are divisible by 40 did not unless they are also divisible by 400.

Henry had advocated transition to the calendar on 1 January 2006 as that is a year in which his calendar and the Gregorian calendar begin the year on the same day. After that date passed, he recommended dropping off 31 December 2006 to start in 2007, or dropping 30 and 31 December 2007 to start 2008.

In late 2011 the calendar was revised by Johns Hopkins economist Steve Hanke by moving the leap week from the middle to the end of the year and renaming it "Extra", producing the Hanke–Henry Permanent Calendar. The target date for universal adoption was 1 January 2017 then, but was postponed to 2018, when the calendar design was changed in early 2016 to adopt Monday as the start of the week, quarter and year, to better comply with existing international standard ISO 8601.

In 2016, web developer Black Tent Digital released the official Hanke-Henry calendar app, with capabilities to convert between Gregorian and Hanke-Henry Calendars, in order to facilitate transition to the Hanke-Henry system. It is no longer available as of March, 2018.

Comparison 

The key difference between Robert McClenon's calendar proposal and Henry's modification is that the former has a simple rule for determining which years have a leap week. This rule resembles the Gregorian leap year rule and has the same cycle length. Years whose numbers are divisible by 5 have a leap week, but years whose numbers are divisible by 40 do not have a leap week unless also divisible by 400. The main drawback of this rule is that the new year varies 17 days relative to the Gregorian new year (e.g. year 1965 begins 11 days earlier than Gregorian 1965 and year 2036 begins 6 days later than Gregorian 2036), whereas Henry's rule ensures that the new year always begins within three days of the Gregorian new year.

The key difference between Irv Bromberg's calendar proposal Symmetry010 and Hanke/Henry’s is the pattern of month lengths, the former putting the longer month in the middle of each quarter (30:31:30). The more ambitious Symmetry454 furthermore has every month consist of exactly 4 or 5 weeks (28:35:28). Both proposals start the week on Monday and are intended to be used with a different leap rule, resulting in a 293-year leap cycle.

Other proposals, like the Pax Calendar from 1930 and the International Fixed Calendar popularized by Cotsworth and Eastman, feature a perennial calendar with 13 months of 28 days each. The former also has a leap week whereas the latter has one day at the end of each year belonging to no month or week and another in leap years.

Advantages 

 The calendar itself is permanent, it does not change year to year, with the exception of the need to add a week at the end of every 5 or 6 years.
 Quarters all have the same number of days, simplifying financial calculations. This calendar would also have prevented Apple’s Q4 2012 reporting fiasco, where due to the odd number of weeks in a year and to ensure a consistent reporting period, Apple reported quarterly results after the usual thirteen weeks instead of the fourteen the year before due to there being a leap week in the quarter, causing many investors who did not notice the adjustment to think that Apple had been less profitable than forecast.
 With the 30:30:31 layout and not counting national holidays, the first two months of each quarter have 22 work days each and every third month (except December with leap week added) has 21 work days if Saturday and Sunday are considered the weekend off from work. The alternative 30:31:30 and 31:30:30 layouts would have greater variance.
 Unlike some other reform proposals, it does not change the days of the week or names of the months.
 The calendar starts on the same day every year, Monday, 1 January. (It was Sunday in earlier versions.)
 As in the Gregorian calendar, Sunday to Sunday is always seven days, as is Saturday to Saturday, or Friday to Friday. Because no days are ever added outside a seven-day week, there should be no objection from religious groups concerned about weekly holy days. (In proposals that add single days outside the week, like the World Calendar, a true "seventh day" of rest or worship would drift between weekends and weekdays.)
 No day is more than 5 days before or after its Gregorian namesake and nearly all days are within 4 days.

Disadvantages 

 Annual fixed-date events (e.g. birthdays, anniversaries) always occur on the same day of the week every year, though many of those with weekend birthdays could see this as an advantage.
 Birthdays and anniversaries occurring on the 53rd (leap) week would occur only once every five to six years, and such birthdays and anniversaries would be over five times  as common as February 29 birthdays and anniversaries are in the Gregorian calendar.
 The calendar is not as precisely aligned with the solar year as the existing Gregorian calendar and some proposed reform calendars, therefore may require continued use of more accurate astronomic calendars for certain agricultural purposes.
 If it became the default calendar, all computer date-handling would have to be fixed, which will be much more complicated than the Y2K fix, although the new compatibility with ISO 8601 week dates would help.
 The changed month lengths do not approximate lunar phases any better.
 Months of 30 or 31 days each do not take full advantage of the perennial nature of leap week calendars, like months of 4 or 5 weeks each would do.
 The leap weeks would complicate time periods counted in months. On the current calendar maximum difference in lengths of such periods is three days. On the Hanke-Henry permanent calendar it would be seven days and the exception would be longer than the norm.
 The last month in each quarter has one day more than the other two (30:30:31), but if, as in ISO 8601, a week belongs to the month the majority of its days are in, then the second month has one week more than the other two (4:5:4).
 Leap years are more difficult to determine than in some other proposals, with the simplest algorithm being dependent on the Gregorian calendar's weekday cycle.
 Doing away with time zones would make for unfamiliar and anomalous situations: for example, noon, i.e. the natural mid-day when the sun is overhead, is vastly set apart from 12:00, the chronographical mid-day, for most places in the world. It would make travel harder as one would have to learn completely new schedules for each longitude.
 The (current) name is not neutral.
 The day-of-month dates of certain holidays, like Halloween/Samhain on 31 October, and events are lost, therefor would need to be celebrated on a different date, e.g. 30 October.

References

External links 

 
 Johns Hopkins press release on C&T
 Press Release: "Time for a Change? Johns Hopkins Scholars Say Calendar Needs Serious Overhaul"
 "Changing Times" by Steve H. Hanke and Richard Conn Henry, Cato Institute

 Slashdot discussion of Dick Henry's C&T
 "Is it time to overhaul the calendar? Profs have a plan", by Stephanie Pappas, LiveScience Senior Writer, 28 December 2011 
 "Proposed calendar would make it same exact day, next year", by Elizabeth Weise, USA Today, 29 December 2011
 "Proposed New Calendar Would Make Time Rational", by Brandon Keim, 28 December 2011
 The radical plan to destroy time zones, Washington Post, 12 February 2016
  https://play.google.com/store/apps/details?id=cz.mixedapps.intime
 

Proposed calendars
Leap week calendars
Specific calendars
2004 works
2004 in science